A list of all Group jump races over horse jumps which take place annually in Italy.

Group 1

Group 2

Group 3

Horse racing in Italy
 List of Italian jump horse races